Waiting For The Sonic Boom is the debut album by Ooberman side-project Ooberon. It was recorded by Andy and Steve Flett, mostly at the latter's home in Wavertree, Liverpool. It includes contributions by Ooberman members Dan Popplewell and Sophia Churney, as well as former Ooberman drummers Jaymie Ireland and Alan Kelly.

Track listing
All songs written by Andy Flett
 "Ooh (All I Wanted)"
 "National Insurance"
 "I Feel Like The Water"
 "Thunder Before Friday"
 "Spiders Inside Butterflies"
 "Monsoon Song"
 "Eye Of The Storm"
 "1000 Miles"
 "Fox And Crow"
 "Twilight Again"
 "Some People"

The track Eye Of The Storm was also featured on Ooberman's Carried Away album. It features all five original members of Ooberman.

External links
Ooberon.net - official website
ooberontheband - official Myspace.com profile

2007 albums